Acroncosa minima is a species of snout moth in the genus Acroncosa. It was described by Herbert H. Neunzig in 2003 and is endemic to the US state of California.

References

Moths described in 2003
Endemic fauna of California
Phycitinae
Moths of North America
Fauna without expected TNC conservation status